Butler County Schools is a public school district in Butler County, Kentucky. The school board is based in Morgantown, Kentucky, USA. Their mascot is the bears for high school and middle school. Morgantown Elementary's mascot is the patriots, and North Butler Elementary school's mascot is the cubs. All schools here have great teachers, who connect with the children.

Schools
The Butler County School District consists of two elementary schools, one middle school and two high schools.

Elementary schools
North Butler Elementary School – KY 70 near Brooklyn. 
Morgantown Elementary School – 210 Cemetery Street, Morgantown

Middle schools
Butler County Middle School – Morgantown

High schools
Butler County High School – Morgantown
Green River School – Boys' Camp Road off US 231 near the Interstate 165 Exit 34 interchange Cromwell

References

External links
 Butler County Schools

School districts in Kentucky
Education in Butler County, Kentucky